Anti Social Media is a Danish pop rock band that represented Denmark in the Eurovision Song Contest 2015 with the song "The Way You Are". The group consists of Philip Thornhill, Nikolaj Tøth, David Vang and Emil Vissing.

Career

2015–present: Eurovision Song Contest
In 2015, Anti Social Media was announced as one of the ten competing musicians in Dansk Melodi Grand Prix 2015 with the song "The Way You Are". On 7 February 2015 Anti Social Media performed the song and won the Dansk Melodi Grand Prix to represent Denmark at the Eurovision Song Contest 2015. On 4 May 2015 Anti Social Media released the single "More Than a Friend". On 11 May 2015 they released their debut EP The Way. At the Eurovision Song Contest 2015 they performed during the first Semi-final on 19 May 2015, they failed to qualify for the final. This was the first time since 2007 that Denmark had failed to qualify to the final.

Members
 Philip Thornhill (10 June 1995) – vocals
 Nikolaj Tøth (17 September 1995) – guitar
 David Vang (22 November 1989) – bass
 Emil Vissing (26 October 1990) – drums

Discography

Extended plays

Singles

References

External links

Eurovision Song Contest entrants for Denmark
Danish pop music groups
Dansk Melodi Grand Prix contestants
Dansk Melodi Grand Prix winners
Eurovision Song Contest entrants of 2015